Clifford–New Glasgow Historic District is a national historic district located at Clifford, Amherst County, Virginia. The district encompasses 43 contributing buildings, 6 contributing sites, and 6 contributing structures in the village of Clifford. The district includes a variety of residential, commercial, and institutional buildings built between about 1772 and 1961.  Notable buildings include the St. Mark's Episcopal Church (c. 1816), the Saddlery (1814), and the Clifford Ruritan Building (c. 1938).  Located in the district and separately listed are Brick House and Winton.

It was listed on the National Register of Historic Places in 2012.

References

Historic districts on the National Register of Historic Places in Virginia
National Register of Historic Places in Amherst County, Virginia